Wiley is an unincorporated community in Rabun County, Georgia, United States. Wiley has a post office with ZIP code 30581.

References

Unincorporated communities in Rabun County, Georgia
Unincorporated communities in Georgia (U.S. state)